Amanda Ingrid Seales (born July 1, 1981), formerly known by the stage name Amanda Diva, is an American comedian and actress.  Since 2017, she has starred in the HBO comedy series Insecure. In 2019, HBO released her first stand-up comedy special I Be Knowin. Then, in 2020, Seales launched Smart Funny & Black, a comedy gameshow that showcases Black culture, history, and experience. Seales was also one of the co-hosts of the syndicated daytime talk show, The Real, alongside Loni Love, Tamera Mowry, Adrienne Bailon, and Jeannie Mai.

Early life
Amanda Seales was born in Inglewood, CA on July 1, 1981. Her mother was born and raised in Mt. Moritz, Grenada. Her father is African-American. As a result, both she and her mother are dual citizens of the US and Grenada. She moved to Orlando, Florida, in 1989, where she later attended Dr. Phillips High School. She graduated from SUNY-Purchase, then acquired a master's degree in African-American studies with a concentration in Hip hop from Columbia University.

Career

Film and television 

Seales's first film was a minor role as Katy in the 1993 movie Cop and a Half. The next year Seales was featured on the Nickelodeon sitcom My Brother and Me (1994) as Deonne Wilburn. In 2002 she appeared on Russell Simmons' Def Poetry Jam. Seales became publicly known as "VJ Amanda Diva" on MTV2 Sucker Free Countdown on Sundays. In 2016 she appeared in a recurring role on the HBO series Insecure, as Tiffany DuBois. Also in 2016, Seales began hosting her own show on truTV called Greatest Ever.

On January 26, 2019, HBO debuted her first stand-up comedy special I Be Knowin'. Bring the Funny is a comedy competition series that premiered on July 9, 2019, on NBC. Seales hosts, alongside judges Kenan Thompson, Chrissy Teigen, and Jeff Foxworthy.

Throughout 2019, Seales served as a frequent guest host for the syndicated daytime talk show The Real. On January 6, 2020, Seales was promoted from guest co-host to permanent co-host. She departed the series after six months of co-hosting, citing her dissatisfaction with the inability to openly speak on recent social issues as a reason. In September 2020, Seales accused The Real of stealing ideas from her show Smart Funny & Black, saying The Real's segment "Black Lives Matter University" featured a logo that closely resembled Smart Funny & Black's emblem.

In June 2020, Seales revealed on social media that she will host the BET Awards 2020 on June 28, 2020.

In February 2022, Seales was cast in the three-part documentary series Everything's Gonna Be All White, airing on Showtime.

Music 
In 2007, Seales replaced Natalie Stewart of the musical duo Floetry on tour with Marsha Ambrosius, and in December of that same year Seales (as Amanda Diva) released her first extended play (EP) Life Experience. In 2008, she was featured on the song "Manwomanboogie" on Q-Tip's Grammy-nominated album The Renaissance. On March 3, 2009, Seales released Spandex, Rhymes & Soul.

Podcast 
Seales hosts a weekly podcast titled Small Doses.

Game Show 
She created and hosts the touring variety game show, Smart Funny & Black, where her love of games and music, was used to serve as a safe space for the Black voice and celebrates the many contributions Black Americans have made to history and pop culture and more.

Activism 
In 2010, Seales teamed up with Truth, to start an anti-smoking campaign.

In November 2014, Seales appeared in a segment on CNN alongside Steve Santagati, hosted by Fredricka Whitfield, discussing the video 10 Hours of Walking in NYC as a Woman. During the segment, Seales said that men catcalling women is not complimentary and that women do not like being catcalled, while Santagati went on to defend men catcalling women, saying that women should take catcalling as a compliment and not abuse.

On June 11, 2017, during a livestream on Katy Perry's YouTube channel, an exchange took place between Seales and Caitlyn Jenner, with Seales saying that Jenner benefits from white privilege. Towards the end of the exchange, Seales told Jenner "This country is here for you. This country ain’t here for me in the same way, sis". Seales has attributed this exchange to her becoming an activist.

Radio 
On April 18, 2022, Seales began co-hosting a new weekly radio show, Amanda Seales’ Smart Funny & Black Radio on SiriusXM, alongside Taj Rani and JeremiahLikeTheBible, featuring topics such as games, celebrity interviews and African-American culture.

Controversies 
In 2019, Seales was involved in a controversy where many people mistakenly reported that she had accused former NFL player and neurosurgeon resident Myron Rolle of sexually harassing several women. She made several Instagram videos alleging he was sexually inappropriate, and was sharing that she had heard those allegations from other women. Multiple people who were spreading that story have since admitted that Seales did not make those allegations herself.

In the weeks preceding Rodney Reed's November 20, 2019, execution date, Seales publicly urged Texas Governor Greg Abbott to exonerate Reed or stay his execution. She later rescinded her support after learning more about his history.

In February 2020, Seales sought controversy while on The Real when defending Jussie Smollett after he was arrested for faking a hate crime. While describing the accusations as alleged, she went on to defend the actor saying, "Even if it was a hoax for the sake of bringing attention to this, then I’m like, that’s low-key noble". In 2022, Smollett was found guilty of orchestrating a fake hate crime and sentenced to 150 days in prison.

In 2021, Seales was criticized for portraying an Alpha Kappa Alpha, or "AKA," on the series Insecure. Real-life members of the sorority responded negatively to Seales' character wearing Alpha Kappa Alpha colors. Seales responded to the criticism in an Instagram video defending her portrayal. It was later reported that the sorority plans to take legal action against Seales.

Discography

EPs

Mixtapes

Guest appearances

Filmography

Film and TV

Music videos

Bibliography 
Seales's first book, 'Small Doses: Potent Truths for Everyday Use' was also released in 2019. The book is an extension of her  podcast of the same name. It is a volume of essays, axioms, original illustrations, and photos from her trademark "self-help from the hip” style of commentary.

References

External links
 
 
 
 
 
 

Living people
1981 births
American hip hop DJs
American radio DJs
American people of Grenadian descent
Musicians from Los Angeles
Actresses from Los Angeles
State University of New York at Purchase alumni
American women rappers
African-American women rappers
West Coast hip hop musicians
African-American actresses
African-American songwriters
Songwriters from California
Radio personalities from Los Angeles
VJs (media personalities)
American women hip hop singers
Dr. Phillips High School alumni
Anti-smoking activists
21st-century American rappers
21st-century American women musicians
American health activists
American women radio presenters
American contemporary R&B singers
African-American television talk show hosts
American television talk show hosts
American women poets
American women podcasters
American podcasters
21st-century African-American women
21st-century African-American musicians
Columbia Graduate School of Arts and Sciences alumni
20th-century African-American people
20th-century African-American women
21st-century women rappers